Bharathi Bhuvania ( Pandey; 18 July 1975) widely known by her stage name Subhashri is an Indian actress known for her works in Tamil, Telugu, Kannada, and Malayalam language films. She is the sister of south actress Malashri, Subhashri starred in about thirty feature films in a variety of roles in films such as Gentleman (1993), Chirabandhavya (1993), Muthu (1995), Pokiri Raja (1995), Pedarayudu (1995), and Minor Mappillai (1996). Subhashri is born in Chennai, her mother tongue is Telugu.

Filmography

Tamil
 Enga Thambi (1993) as Indu – Debut in Tamil  
 Gentleman (1993) as Suganthi 
  Kanmani (1994)
 Thaatboot Thanjavoor (1994)    
 Muthu (1995) as Padmini 
 Thai Thangai Paasam (1995)
 Aarusamy (1996) 
 Minor Mappillai (1996)

Malayalam
 Hitlist (1996) as Maya

Telugu
 Andaru Andare (1994)    
 Gangmaster (1994)   
 Pokiri Raja (1995) as Nikitha    
 Pedarayudu (1995) as Teacher 
 Punya Bhoomi Naa Desam (1995)     
 Ooha (1996)   
 Maa Aavida Collector (1996)   
 Akka Bagunnava (1996)         
 Allari Pellam (1996)              
 Hello Neeku Naaku Pellanta (1996)  
 Peddannayya (1997) as Neelaveni   
 Kurralla Rajyam (1997)
 Atta.. Nee Koduku Jagratta (1997)     
 Allari Pellikoduku (1997)              
 Kaliyugamlo Gandaragolam (1997)

Kannada
 Navibbaru Namagibbaru (1993)
 Chirabandhavya (1993) 
 Soma (1996)
 Shreemathi Kalyana (1996)
 Pattanakke Banda Putta (1996)
 Circle Inspector (1997)
 Mavana Magalu (1997)
 Bhanda Alla Bahaddur (1997) 
 Kalyani (1997)
 Gandhada Gudi Bhaga 2 (1994)

References

External links
 

Actresses in Tamil cinema
Living people
Telugu people
Actresses in Telugu cinema
Actresses from Chennai
Indian film actresses
Indian Hindus
20th-century Indian actresses
21st-century Indian actresses
Female models from Karnataka
1975 births
Actresses in Malayalam cinema
Actresses in Kannada cinema